The 1982 NCAA Division I Field Hockey Championship was the second women's collegiate field hockey tournament organized by the National Collegiate Athletic Association, to determine the top college field hockey team in the United States. The Old Dominion Lady Monarchs won their first championship, defeating the defending national champion Connecticut Huskies in the final.

Bracket

References 

NCAA Division I Field Hockey Championship
Field Hockey
NCAA